EML Wambola (M311) is a Lindau-class minehunter of the Estonian Navy  Mineships Division, formerly the German warship Cuxhaven. The commanding officer of the vessel is Captain Jaanus Antson.
The minehunter Wambola is the first vessel of the Estonian Navy Mineships Division and also the first modernized Lindau-class minehunter. A black keel on a silver background with a golden battle-axe is on the coat of arms of the vessel. The battle-axe is a weapon used by the ancient Estonians which also symbolizes their fighting spirit and strength. The ships motto is the Latin "Ad unquem" which is in English "Onto the nail head". The coat of arms was designed by Priit Herodes. In 2000 a cooperation contract was signed between the Pärnu city council and the minehunter Wambola which gave the vessel a right to wear the Pärnu town coat of arms and to introduce the city in all foreign harbors across the world.

History
EML Wambola (M311) was built in West Germany, in a Burmester shipyard in Bremen. The vessel was launched on 11 March 1959 and she entered service in the same year. The ship's name comes from the city of Cuxhaven in Germany. Originally Cuxhaven was a minesweeper but was transformed into a minehunter in late 1970s. The German Navy decommissioned Cuxhaven and one of her twin sisters Lindau on 9 October 2003 and gave the vessels to the Estonian Navy to operate. On the ceremony the vessel received an Estonian name Wambola. Estonian Navy decommissioned Wambola on 26 March 2009.

See also

 BALTRON project

References

External links

Estonian Navy

Ships built in Bremen (state)
1959 ships
Cold War minesweepers of Germany
Lindau-class minesweepers of the Estonian Navy
Estonian Mineships Division